Brian M. Hoffman (born August 7, 1941 in Chicago) is an American bioinorganic and physical chemist.

Career
Hoffman is a graduate of Lane Tech High School in Chicago and then studied chemistry at the University of Chicago receiving a bachelor's degree in 1962 and at Caltech with a PhD in chemistry in 1966 under the direction of Harden M. McConnell. Hoffman was briefly a postdoctoral scholar with Alexander Rich at MIT. In 1967 he started his appointment at Northwestern University, where he has remained throughout his career.

Research and recognition
Using electron-nuclear double-resonance (ENDOR) spectroscopy, Hoffman has investigated many enzyme mechanisms.  Subject of this work include nitric oxide synthase, cytochrome P450, nickel-iron hydrogenase, and nitrogenase.

In 2012, he received the Joseph Chatt Award, in 2013 the F. A. Cotton Medal. He also received the Bruker Award He is a member of the National Academy of Sciences (2006), the American Academy of Arts and Sciences (2002) and the American Association for the Advancement of Science (1983). He was a Sloan Fellow.

References

External links
Faculty page

1941 births
21st-century American chemists
Inorganic chemists
University of Chicago alumni
California Institute of Technology alumni
Northwestern University faculty
People from Chicago
Members of the United States National Academy of Sciences
Fellows of the American Academy of Arts and Sciences
Living people